Bartonella rattaustraliani is a bacterium from the genus Bartonella which was isolated from the blood of rats from the genus of Melomys.

References

External links
Type strain of Bartonella rattaustraliani at BacDive -  the Bacterial Diversity Metadatabase

Bartonellaceae
Bacteria described in 2009